This article describes the history of cricket in the West Indies from 1919 to 1945.

Inter-Colonial Tournament
The 1891–92 season had seen the first Inter-Colonial Tournament in the West Indies and these took place irregularly until the Second World War, winners in the inter-war period being:
 1922-23 – Barbados
 1923-24 – Barbados
 1924-25 – Trinidad and Tobago
 1925-26 – Trinidad and Tobago
 1926-27 – Barbados
 1928-29 – Trinidad and Tobago
 1929-30 – British Guiana
 1931-32 – Trinidad and Tobago
 1933-34 – Trinidad and Tobago
 1934-35 – British Guiana
 1935-36 – British Guiana
 1936-37 – Trinidad and Tobago
 1937-38 – British Guiana
 1938-39 – Trinidad and Tobago

After the war, there was no inter-country competition until the foundation of the Shell Shield in 1965, though the teams played occasional matches against each other in the intervening period.

English tours of the West Indies
Between the two World Wars, various English teams toured the West Indies.  The 1929-30 team was the first to play Test cricket in the West Indies.  West Indies was already capable of competing at the highest level with players like George Headley and Learie Constantine.

England 1925-26

LH Tennyson's XI 1926-27

LH Tennyson's XI 1927-28

Sir Julien Cahn's XI 1928-29

England 1929-30

 1st Test at Kensington Oval, Bridgetown, Barbados – match drawn	
 2nd Test at Queen's Park Oval, Port of Spain, Trinidad – England won by 167 runs
 3rd Test at Bourda, Georgetown – West Indies won by 289 runs
 4th Test at Sabina Park, Kingston – match drawn

Lord Tennyson's XI 1931-32

England 1934-35

 1st Test at Kensington Oval, Bridgetown, Barbados – England won by 4 wickets
 2nd Test at Queen's Park Oval, Port of Spain, Trinidad – West Indies won by 217 runs
 3rd Test at Bourda, Georgetown – match drawn	
 4th Test at Sabina Park, Kingston – West Indies won by an innings and 161 runs

References

External sources
 CricketArchive – itinerary of events

Further reading
 Cricket: A History of its Growth and Development by Rowland Bowen 
 Beyond a Boundary by C. L. R. James
 Wisden Cricketers' Almanack

1918-19 to 1945